Komenda Sugar Factory is a Ghanaian factory established in 1964 and its operations ground to a halt in the early 1990s. This was due to poor management and technical issues.

Revival 
The sugar factory collapsed and it was inaugurated by the erstwhile John Mahama government in 2016. This was made possible by a loan facility of 35 million dollars from an Indian EXIM Bank.

References 

Manufacturing companies of Ghana
Manufacturing companies established in 1964
Food manufacturers
1964 establishments in Ghana